The men's 20 kilometres walk event at the 2011 Summer Universiade was held on 18 August.

Medalists

Individual

Team

Results

References
Results

Walk
2011